Suria may refer to:

 Súria, a city in Spain
 Suria (Celtic deity), a female deification of good flowing water in ancient Celtic polytheism
 Suria (radio station), a private radio station licensed to Kuala Lumpur, Malaysia
 Suria (TV channel), a Malay-language television channel in Singapore
 Suria KLCC, a shopping centre in Kuala Lumpur

See also
 Surya (disambiguation)
 Tomás de Suría (1761–1844), Spanish artist and explorer